Peter Gerard Richert (born October 29, 1939) is an American former professional baseball player. He played in Major League Baseball as a left-handed pitcher with the Los Angeles Dodgers (1962–64, 1972–73), Washington Senators (1965–67), Baltimore Orioles (1967–71), St. Louis Cardinals (1974) and Philadelphia Phillies (1974).

Baseball career
In his Major League debut on April 12, against the Cincinnati Reds at Dodger Stadium, Richert set a record by striking out the first six batters he faced. He entered the game with two outs in the top of the second inning with his Dodgers trailing 4–0, and struck out Vada Pinson for the final out. Richert then recorded a four-strikeout third inning in which his victims were Frank Robinson (his future Baltimore Orioles teammate), Gordy Coleman (who reached first base on a passed ball by Johnny Roseboro), Wally Post and Johnny Edwards; his record-tying sixth strikeout was of Tommy Harper leading off the fourth. Richert remains the only pitcher to record a four-strikeout inning in his Major League debut. Richert won the game in 3 innings of relief, giving up no hits or walks and striking out seven.

That year, he went 5–4 as a spot starter in a rotation led by the future Hall-of-Fame duo of Don Drysdale and Sandy Koufax. 

In , he went 5–3 on a Dodgers team which won the World Series; Richert did not pitch in the Series, in which the Dodgers swept the New York Yankees.

After the  season, Richert, Frank Howard, Ken McMullen, Dick Nen and Phil Ortega were traded to the Washington Senators for fellow pitcher Claude Osteen, infielder John Kennedy and $100,000 cash. In the former he won a career-high 15 games with a 2.60 earned run average, also a career high. In the latter, Richert went 14–14 with a 3.37 ERA and set a career-high with 195 strikeouts. He struck out seven consecutive batters in an April 24 game against the Detroit Tigers in the latter year, but still lost, 4–0. 

Richert was also an All-Star during both seasons and was the losing pitcher in the 1966 game, giving up a single to former Dodgers teammate Maury Wills, which scored Tim McCarver for the winning run in the 10th inning.

After going 2–6 to start the  season, Richert was acquired by the Baltimore Orioles in a deal sending Mike Epstein and Frank Bertaina to Washington. Richert went 7–10 with the Orioles in this, his final season as a starter. 

In  he went 6–3 with a 3.47 earned run average in his first season as a relief pitcher.

In 1969 he went 7–4 with 12 saves and a 2.20 ERA. The Orioles lost the World Series in surprising fashion to the New York Mets, and Richert was involved in a controversial play which ended Game 4. In the bottom of the 10th, with the game tied at 1–1, J. C. Martin laid down a bunt and was hit by Richert's throw; the error allowed Rod Gaspar to score the winning run from second. Television replays later showed Martin was running inside the baseline, which could have resulted in him being called out for interference.

In , Richert went 7–2 with 13 saves and a 1.98 ERA. He was a member of the championship team that year, the Orioles defeating the Cincinnati Reds in five games. Richert saved Game 1 of that Series in relief of Jim Palmer. 

Richert returned to the Dodgers upon being traded, along with Frank Robinson, from the Orioles for Doyle Alexander, Bob O'Brien, Sergio Robles and Royle Stillman at the Winter Meetings on December 2, 1971. He was dealt from the Dodgers to the Cardinals for Tommie Agee two years later at the Winter Meetings on December 5, 1973.

During a 13-year baseball career, Richert compiled 80 wins, 925 strikeouts, and a 3.19 earned run average.

See also

 List of Major League Baseball single-inning strikeout leaders

References

External links

Pete Richert at SABR (Baseball BioProject)
Pete Richert at Baseball Almanac
 "BASEBALL NOTES/ Giants Hire A's Richert As Fresno Pitching Coach" San Francisco Chronicle, Thursday, November 25, 1999

1939 births
Living people
American League All-Stars
Baltimore Orioles players
Los Angeles Dodgers players
St. Louis Cardinals players
Philadelphia Phillies players
Washington Senators (1961–1971) players
Major League Baseball pitchers
Baseball players from New York (state)
Reno Silver Sox players
Green Bay Bluejays players
Atlanta Crackers players
Spokane Indians players
Omaha Dodgers players
People from Floral Park, New York